Marmoset is a music agency with headquarters in Portland, Oregon. Founded in 2010 by Ryan Wines and Brian Hall, Marmoset represents vintage, emerging, and independent artists, bands, and record labels for licensing. Marmoset's Music Production Team specializes in creating original music, soundtracks, and scores for brand campaigns, film, and television. Marmoset’s clients include Apple, Nike, Google, Levi’s, Facebook, Coca-Cola, Wieden + Kennedy, Droga5, Ogilvy, BBDO, DDB, CP+B, Goodby Silverstein, Grey Worldwide, McCann, Leo Burnett.  The music agency has also developed a music search and licensing platform at marmosetmusic.com. In 2019, Marmoset became the first Certified B Corporation music agency on the planet, providing tangible metrics, social sustainability and environmental standards, and committing to public transparency in the global B Corp community.

Capabilities
Marmoset’s main services are Music Production Team and Music Licensing. The search tool offers advanced music filtering technology, allowing users to find and license music easily with custom search elements.

References

2010 establishments in Oregon
Companies based in Portland, Oregon